Berwick is a rural community in Kings County, New Brunswick, Canada. It is situated along Route 10.

History

Notable people

See also
List of communities in New Brunswick

References

Communities in Kings County, New Brunswick